Motion: Live: 9.17.97, commonly referred to as Motion, is a live EP released by The Mayfield Four, released in 1997. It is a very rare item and is a highly sought after collector's item among fans. Former Mayfield Four vocalist Myles Kennedy has stated that "only about 5,000 copies were ever made".

The album does not have a bar code, due to the fact that it was only sold at the band's concerts.

Album cover 
The building on the front of the album is the Suki-Yaki inn, a small Japanese restaurant from downtown Spokane.  The band was known for hanging out there a lot when they were younger.  The inn is a couple of blocks away from Outback Jack's, where the album was recorded.

Track listing

The song "10K" was also featured on the Japanese import version of Fallout.

References 

1997 debut EPs
The Mayfield Four albums